Ruda is a municipality and village in Žďár nad Sázavou District in the Vysočina Region of the Czech Republic. It has about 400 inhabitants.

Administrative parts
The village of Lhotka is an administrative part of Ruda.

References

Villages in Žďár nad Sázavou District